James Edwin Hyslop (7 November 1861 – 11 January 1928) was a Scottish businessman and landowner, who settled in the Mexican state of Chihuahua, and founder of several mining companies.

Childhood 

James Hyslop was born in Kirkhill, Highland, Scotland on 7 November 1861, son of William Hyslop and Margaret Gowenlock. He came from an influential Scottish family, shareholder of various companies in the United Kingdom, among which were mining companies, agricultural and livestock companies, as well as psychiatric hospitals.

Hyslop lived the first years of his childhood in the city of Inverness, Scotland and later in his youth, his family would settle permanently in Church Stretton, England, where he lived along his 7 siblings. At the age of 19, interested in his family's mining business, he decided to study Mining Engineering at Oxford University, from which he obtained a First Class Hons degree.

Migration, companies and fortune 
He arrived in Mexico in 1895, to Parral, Chihuahua, as co-owner and General Manager of "San Francisco del Oro Mines, LTD", a London based mining firm that had 20 mines in Mexico and 7 mines abroad. Different minerals such as gold, silver, copper and zinc were extracted in these mines. This mining company was founded by James Hyslop and other English aristocrats, including Rudolph Feilding, 9th Earl of Denbigh. Also, in the year 1900, Hyslop founded, together with the British, William Harrison, the mining company "The Guggenheim Smelting Co." Company that operated in the state of Chihuahua, which had 5 mines, where silver and zinc were mainly extracted.

In 1908, James Hyslop, together with the British engineer and investor Weetman Pearson, established the "Compañía Mexicana de Petróleo El Águila S.A." oil company. It came to represent 50% of the oil market in Mexico, where it operated for 30 years. It was expropriated in 1938 and dissolved in 1963.

He inherited from his father-in-law the "Hacienda De Santiago", a famous hacienda built in the Spanish Viceroyalty, where agricultural, livestock and textile activities were practiced. It was established as the official residence of the family. 

Hyslop saw the great business opportunity that Hacienda represented in Mexico at the time, by which he acquired estates across different states in the country. Very diverse activities were performed at the different "Haciendas", including textile production, wood production, agricultural production, dairies, vineyards, brickyards and livestock handling.

Later, in 1910, James Hyslop would become one of the most recognized businessmen in Mexico at the beginning of the 20th century, during the Porfiriato period. He had investments in very diverse sectors, such as mining, oil, rail transport, livestock and agriculture. He also acquired extensive tracts of land in Mexico and the United States, which led him to become a landowner.

Family 

In 1903, Hyslop married Maria Beckmann, daughter of the German William Christian Beckmann, another prominent miner with land extensions in the district of Parral, Chihuahua. James and Maria had seven children, Margaret, William, Mary, Letitia, James, Beatrice and Henry.

Death 
On 11 January 1928, Hyslop suffered a heart attack due to a condition he had been suffering for several years.

References 

British mining businesspeople
1862 births
1931 deaths
People from Inverness
Alumni of the University of Oxford
Scottish businesspeople
Scottish emigrants to Mexico